Viphurit Siritip (born 1995), known by his nickname Phum, is a Thai singer-songwriter. He achieved international fame in 2018 from his single "Lover Boy". His music demonstrates influences of various genres, especially neo soul.

Biography
Viphurit was born in Bangkok, Thailand. His father is an architect, while his mother is a graphic designer. Viphurit moved to Hamilton, New Zealand when he was 9. While in New Zealand, he got his first instrument; a drum which he had desired to have since he was little. However, Viphurit was forced to stop playing the drums and turned to guitar since the drum sound was said to be disturbing the neighbours.  Viphurit moved back to Thailand when he was 18 to study at Mahidol University International College.

In Thailand, Viphurit became known on from his original and cover songs on YouTube, and signed to indie label Rats Records. He released his debut album Manchild in 2017. His following two singles, "Long Gone" and "Lover Boy", earned him international recognition as their music videos spread online. He toured internationally in 2018, performing in Hong Kong, Taiwan, South Korea, Japan, Poland, Germany, England, France, Switzerland, Italy, the Netherlands, the United States, Indonesia, Malaysia, Philippines and Singapore.

Discography

Studio albums

Extended plays

Singles

As lead artist

As featured artist

Music Videos

Guest appearances

References

Phum Viphurit
Phum Viphurit
People from Hamilton, New Zealand
Living people
1995 births
Phum Viphurit
Bedroom pop musicians
Phum Viphurit
Thai emigrants to New Zealand